Coleophora noaeae is a moth of the family Coleophoridae.

The larvae feed on Noaea mucronata. They feed on the leaves, flower buds and fruits of their host plant.

References

noaeae
Moths described in 1989